In the 1960s and 1970s, an envisioned fourth UK television service was popularly referred to as ITV2, before the launch of Channel 4 (and its Welsh counterpart, S4C) in November 1982.

History

Development
During the established 1954 Act, plans for "independent television" to consist of two or more channels in a given area were discussed its first inception, where ways of allowing the component companies to compete directly with one another were considered. When the first broadcasts went on the air in September 1955, there was not enough frequency space allocated for television, leading to the approach whereby each company was allotted a part of the country (or in the larger areas a period of the seven-day week, weekdays or weekend):

This arrangement had not seen as ideal and the Independent Television Authority (was also admitted as an active member of the European Broadcasting Union on 1 January 1960) along with the regional companies continually pushed the government for capacity to license a second set of franchises.

Proposals
When transmissions began on 625-line ultra high frequency in the early 1960s, the General Post Office were afforded the task of allocating each transmitter region with a set of frequencies that would provide maximum coverage and minimal interference; this provided capacity for four television channels, allowing one each for the existing BBC (later became BBC1) and ITV services already carried on 405-line very high frequency, one for the new BBC2 (from 20 April 1964) and a fourth for future allocations. By 1968, the ITA considered this sufficiently likely that the new franchises were awarded for the next ten-year period they included a clause that allowed the licence to be revoked and reconsidered if a fourth UHF network became a reality. 

The term "ITV2" became popular as itself grew in popularity for this station, which had previously been referred to as "Independent Television" or "Commercial Television". In anticipation of the second network, it was common for television sets with push-button controls manufactured during the 1960s and 1970s to have buttons labelled "BBC1", "BBC2", "ITV1" and "ITV2". 

During late 1969, the ITA already started broadcasting in colour using the PAL system (except in the Channel Islands) was officially available across the entire network:

The issue was a sensitive political point: the Labour Party of the 1950s and 1960s had traditionally been against commercial television and many on the left of the party wanted to see all commercial television abolished, advocating instead for an expansion of the BBC (which was not acted upon, most likely due to cost). The following Conservative government, and advocates of commercial broadcasting were also slow to act in implementing a new network after Edward Heath's victory in the general election on 18 June 1970, instead concentrating on Independent Local Radio when the Sound Broadcasting Act received royal assent on 12 July 1972, and the Independent Television Authority accordingly changed its name to the Independent Broadcasting Authority on the same day.

On 3 February 1977, the Annan Committee on the Future of Broadcasting made its recommendations including the establishment of a fourth independent television channel, the establishment of the Broadcasting Complaints Commission and an increase in independent production. With the approach of the 1979 general election on 3 May, both the Conservatives and Labour included plans for a fourth channel in their election manifestos. Labour favoured an Open Broadcasting Authority community service aimed at minority groups, while the Conservatives' plan was for the channel to be given to ITV. Both main parties also pledged to launch a separate Welsh language television service for Wales, but when the Conservatives were elected, the new Home Secretary William Whitelaw decided against the idea and suggested, except for an occasional opt-out, that the service should be the same as offered in the rest of the United Kingdom. This led to acts of civil disobedience including refusals to pay the television licence fee, and sit-ins used for both the BBC and HTV studios with some attacks on various transmitters for the Welsh-speaking areas.

On 17 September 1980, the government reversed its position on a separate Welsh language service for Wales as following opposition from the public and politicians including a threat from the former president of Plaid Cymru, Gwynfor Evans to go on hunger strike and the idea was given the green light, this led to the establishment of the Welsh Fourth Channel Authority. Later on 13 November of that year, the Broadcasting Act paves its way for leading process to create the new fourth television service as a subsidiary, with its subscription will be levied on the ITV regional companies to pay for this channel whether they selling airtime in return.

Aftermath
On 1 January 1981, the Channel Four Television Company was established to providing the service – for England, Scotland and Northern Ireland – led by Edmund Dell appointed as chairman and Jeremy Isaacs also became its chief executive, as well as the Welsh language channel will be although it will broadcast some English programmes during off-peak hours. From 2 August 1982, the trade test transmissions commenced, mainly consisting of the IBA's ETP-1 broadcasts between 9.00am and 8.00pm every day.

The two resultant services began in November 1982. It could be said that this was the long-awaited "ITV2" in all but name as it was operated and regulated by the Independent Broadcasting Authority. It was funded by ITV and then had a substantial amount of content produced by the major companies until 31 December 1992:

On 1 January 1993, Channel 4 became an independent statutory corporation and under the terms of the Broadcasting Act 1990 was now also allowed to sell its own airtime. Under the Act, ITV agreed to fund Channel 4 if total advertising revenue fell below 14%. The network also made a payment of £38 million to ITV under terms of its funding formula.

It was not until 7 December 1998 – 16 years after the launch of Channel 4 and S4C – that the name ITV2 was used for a new digital network in England and Wales to operate a single service with no regional content. On 11 August 2001, the ITV channel was renamed ITV1, a name that had been used on labelled push-buttons on many British television sets during the 1960s and 1970s.

See also
 Toddlers' Truce
 Pilkington Committee on Broadcasting
 Colour Strike
 History of ITV
 Timeline of ITV
 Timeline of Channel 4
 Timeline of S4C

Sources

Notes

  From 6 April 1964, the name Associated-Rediffusion was dropped in favour of its new branding – Rediffusion Television (or simply also known as Rediffusion, London) – to reflect cultural changes and output altered accordingly.
  On 8 October 1955, the franchisee was successfully sued by the cinema chain Associated British Picture Corporation (who also owned a film distribution company which later became Elstree Studios), and was forced to rename this network to avoid confusion with the ABC Weekend TV that would start broadcasting in February 1956.
  Up until 29 July 1968, the North of England region separates into two new smaller areas – North West and Yorkshire – as well as weekend franchises (include ABC also serving in the Midlands) were abolished, and replaced by seven-day contractors used for ATV, Granada and YTV.
  The franchise was originally awarded to Kemsley-Winnick Television on 26 October 1954 to provide a weekend service for Midlands and North of England, but the consortium withdrew their financial exposure. The contract was re-awarded to ABC Weekend TV on 21 September 1955 shortly before ITV started.
  On 21 June 1967, TWW loses its licence to the Harlech Consortium (led by David Ormsby-Gore) was unsuccessfully fought decision throughout the press, and ITA remained legally entitled to remove the contract at any time for some reason.
  The ITA has awarded their contract to provide in the Channel Islands (under its British crown dependency) as they pointed out when the established 1954 Act does not include provision with a result to operate an ITV service there, it would have to be permitted by means of extending the Act with an Order in Council.
  As from 26 January 1964, WWN stops broadcasting after going bankrupt and later absorbed by TWW, offering a generous package from WWN's shareholders in order to gain control of the territory and kept Teledu Cymru name on air until 1968.
  Colour television in the Channel Islands commenced for the first time on 26 July 1976, delays were cost of upgrading the studios due to the technical difficulties which provide several UHF links from the mainland between United Kingdom (PAL) and France (SECAM); a special receiving antenna called "Steerable Adaptive Broadcast Reception Equipment" – or "SABRE" for short – specially designed and developed by the IBA engineers was installed at Alderney and beamed over-the-air signal in Jersey.
  On 28 December 1980, the IBA has announced for three new franchises will commence from 1 January 1982 as the Midlands area splits into two and dual regions were also created. ATV re-awarded its contract although there are several conditions attached, including more content and increased production facilities to rename itself as Central Independent Television. Southern lost its licence with the favour of TVS (originally called South & South East Communications) and Westward also loses its licence completely to be replaced by TSW before ended up going on the air on 11 August 1981, but continued to use the name until 31 December of that year.
  Between 28 February and 13 June 1967, several national and regional newspapers carrying advertisements requested by ITA's new seven-day programme contractors for the eastern half of the Pennines area was first awarded to Telefusion (created by the Blackpool-based rental chain), then later merged to another applicant which took the name Yorkshire Television that replaces Granada on weekdays and ABC for weekends. The station began broadcasting on 29 July 1968 from its new purpose-built studios at Kirkstall Road in Leeds was officially opened by the Duchess of Kent.
  ATV lost the weekend licence to David Frost's London Television Consortium which been expected that ABC would take over the franchise before starts broadcasting on 2 August 1968, and because to this day is the start of technicians' strike forces ITV off the air for several weeks although manage to launch a temporary service with no regional variations.
  Beginning in 1982, the Friday handover hours for Thames and LWT is moved from 7.00pm to the earlier time of 5.15pm. On 8 January 1993, it was changed to an regular 5.40pm slot after programmes were also used for the new weekday contractor Carlton Television, which remained on air until 25 October 2002 before operates a full seven-day service with its single branding three days later.
  On 19 December 1967, Rediffusion and ABC asked to form a joint company for London's weekday franchise in attempt to keep the network as a new name controlled by ABC which owns 51%, while Rediffusion also owned 49%. The service started broadcasting on 30 July 1968 and its first week on air disrupted by sporadic strike action.
  Prior to 4 March 1968, TWW ceases broadcasting shortly before its contract was due to expire, selling the final months of airtime to Harlech Television. However the new contractor is not yet ready to go on air, so the ITA provides an interim service takes over the franchise just two months ahead for the planned date of 20 May.
  On 24 July 2009, the coverage was transferred from Border to Granada following digital switchover in the Isle of Man.
  The ETP-1 testcard was broadcast for the final time on 31 December 1992 after which Channel 4 showed either a holding slide or 4-Tel on View during closedown periods as the network gradually increased its overnight programmes before going 24 hours a day from 6 January 1997.
  From 1 November 1998, S4C launched a separate Welsh-only digital service broadcasts 12 hours every day (which later extended to 22 hours) with some output exclusive to this network, while the analogue service continued with Channel 4 programmes until it was ceased on 31 March 2010, after the transmitters were fully switched off as the last one to close was Wenvoe.
  On 28 June 1997, HTV is fully taken over by United News & Media also backed with two regional contractors – Anglia Television and Meridian Broadcasting – for £370 million. As from 2 July 2001, it was later sold by Carlton Communications (owners of London's weekday franchise, which includes Central and Westcountry on 6 September 1999) to comply with competition laws resulted in a break-up for the majority of production facilities, broadcast licence and hence its advertising revenues before merging with Granada to create a single company for England and Wales called ITV plc on 2 February 2004.
  On 16 October 1991, the three regional companies – Thames, TVS and TSW – to lose their licences when the ITC conduct a auction whereby contracts would be given to the highest bidder, subject to fulfilling an 'quality threshold' within the business plan was a subjective evaluation whether could afford its programmes and also to pay amounts for each bid, ahead before the new franchises – Carlton, Meridian and Westcountry – to be replaced at midnight from 1 January 1993, also changes the system of licence allocation now legally known as Channel 3.
  From 2 September 1996, Tyne Tees Television became Channel 3 North East which retains the company name although this unpopular branding was scrapped and returned to the airwaves on 9 March 1998.
  On 11 June 1997, Scottish Television buys Grampian for £105 million as the company became SMG.
  By 19 October 2015, UTV Media announces that it will sell the franchise with its brand name to ITV plc for £100 million as subject to regulatory approval, and the sale was finally completed on 29 February 2016.
  S2 launched on 30 April 1999 was the holder of both Scottish and Grampian region franchises that broadcasts between 4.00pm and 2.00am, with its target audience being 16- to 34-year-olds. Although initially had great ambitions for the station until it was closed on 27 July 2001 as part of a deal with ITV Digital.
  UTV launches a second channel TV You on 28 June 1999 was available only to viewers for digital terrestrial and NTL cable in Northern Ireland, until the station closes on 22 January 2002 following a deal with ITV Digital to be replaced by ITV2.
  The expansion of ITV's services due to the growing number of various digital networks include ITV2, as well as ITV Sport Channel and ITV Select were both launched on 11 August 2001, before placed into administration on 27 March 2002 within the company still owes £180 million which cannot pay after its revenue by several forecasts predicted.
  ITV1 reverted to the name "ITV" between 14 January 2013 and 14 November 2022.

References

History of television in the United Kingdom
1960s in the United Kingdom
1960s in British television
1970s in the United Kingdom
1970s in British television